The 1945–46 Division 2 season was the second tier of ice hockey in Sweden for 1945–46.  The league consisted of 41 teams, divided into seven geographical groups of five or six teams.  The seven group winners—Brynäs IF (norra), Hofors IK (Dala), Forshaga IF (västra), Åkers IF (Sörmland), IFK Stockholm (östra), Västerås IK (Västmanland), and UoIF Matteuspojkarna (södra)—continued to a promotion qualifier, which resulted in Forshaga, Åker, Västerås, and Matteuspojkarna being promoted to Division 1 for the 1946–47 season.

Final standings

Norra

Dalagruppen

Västra

Sörmlandsgruppen

Östra

Värmlandsgruppen

Södra

References

Division 2 (Swedish ice hockey) seasons
2